Saidur Rahman may refer to:

 Saidur Rahman Dawn (born 1963), Bangladeshi sprinter
 Saidur Rahman (professor) (born 1966), computer scientist